This is a complete list of the speakers of the Michigan House of Representatives. Elected by the members of the House, the Speaker is the presiding officer of that body. In addition to duties as chair, the adopted rules of the House of Representatives specify other powers and duties of the post. The Speaker is currently elected for a two-year term in the odd-numbered years in which the Legislature convenes.

Several speakers have gone on to pursue and achieve higher office, including as a member of Congress or as Governor of Michigan.

References

 
House of Representatives Speakers
Michigan